Jacques Mauclair (12 January 1919 – 21 December 2001) was a French film actor. He appeared in 30 films between 1950 and 2000. He was born in Paris, France.

Filmography

References

External links

1919 births
2001 deaths
French male film actors
Male actors from Paris